Verkhnyaya Zaninka is a rural locality (a village) in Vyatkinskoye Rural Settlement, Sudogodsky District, Vladimir Oblast, Russia. The population was 40 as of 2010.

Geography 
Verkhnyaya Zaninka is located 47 km northwest of Sudogda (the district's administrative centre) by road. Ulybyshevo is the nearest rural locality.

References 

Rural localities in Sudogodsky District